The 2010 Big South men's basketball tournament was played March 2, 4, and 6, 2010, on campus sites. The semifinal round was be televised on ESPNU and the finals on ESPN2.

Format
The top eight eligible men's basketball teams in the Big South Conference receive a berth in the conference tournament.  After the 18 game conference season, teams are seeded by conference record.  Since the Winthrop Eagles won the tournament, they received an automatic bid to the NCAA tournament.  Also, the #1 seed Coastal Carolina Chanticleers received an automatic bid to the NIT.

Bracket

 asterisk indicates overtime game

References

Tournament
Big South Conference men's basketball tournament
Big South Conference men's basketball tournament
Big South Conference men's basketball tournament